Epiphenomenalism is a position on the mind–body problem which holds that physical and biochemical events within the human body (sense organs, neural impulses, and muscle contractions, for example) are the sole cause of mental events (thought, consciousness, and cognition). According to this view, subjective mental events are completely dependent for their existence on corresponding physical and biochemical events within the human body, yet themselves have no influence over physical events. The appearance that subjective mental states (such as intentions) influence physical events is merely an illusion. For instance, fear seems to make the heart beat faster, but according to epiphenomenalism the biochemical secretions of the brain and nervous system (such as adrenaline)—not the experience of fear—is what raises the heartbeat. Because mental events are a kind of overflow that cannot cause anything physical, yet have non-physical properties, epiphenomenalism is viewed as a form of property dualism.

Development
During the seventeenth century, René Descartes argued that animals are subject to mechanical laws of nature. He defended the idea of automatic behavior, or the performance of actions without conscious thought. Descartes questioned how the immaterial mind and the material body can interact causally. His interactionist model (1649) held that the body relates to the mind through the pineal gland. La Mettrie, Leibniz, and Spinoza all in their own way began this way of thinking. The idea that even if the animal were conscious nothing would be added to the production of behavior, even in animals of the human type, was first voiced by La Mettrie (1745), and then by Cabanis (1802), and was further explicated by Hodgson (1870) and Huxley (1874).

Thomas Henry Huxley agreed with Descartes that behavior is determined solely by physical mechanisms, but he also believed that humans enjoy an intelligent life. In 1874, Huxley argued, in the Presidential Address to the British Association for the Advancement of Science, that animals are conscious automata. Huxley proposed that psychical changes are collateral products of physical changes. Like the bell of a clock that has no role in keeping the time, consciousness has no role in determining behavior.

Huxley defended automatism by testing reflex actions, originally supported by Descartes. Huxley hypothesized that frogs that undergo lobotomy would swim when thrown into water, despite being unable to initiate actions. He argued that the ability to swim was solely dependent on the molecular change in the brain, concluding that consciousness is not necessary for reflex actions. According to epiphenomenalism, animals experience pain only as a result of neurophysiology.

In 1870, Huxley conducted a case study on a French soldier who had sustained a shot in the Franco-Prussian War that fractured his left parietal bone. Every few weeks the soldier would enter a trance-like state, smoking, dressing himself, and aiming his cane like a rifle all while being insensitive to pins, electric shocks, odorous substances, vinegar, noise, and certain light conditions. Huxley used this study to show that consciousness was not necessary to execute these purposeful actions, justifying the assumption that humans are insensible machines. Huxley's mechanistic attitude towards the body convinced him that the brain alone causes behavior.

In the early 1900s scientific behaviorists such as Ivan Pavlov, John B. Watson, and B. F. Skinner began the attempt to uncover laws describing the relationship between stimuli and responses, without reference to inner mental phenomena. Instead of adopting a form of eliminativism or mental fictionalism, positions that deny that inner mental phenomena exist, a behaviorist was able to adopt epiphenomenalism in order to allow for the existence of mind. George Santayana (1905) believed that all motion has merely physical causes.  Because consciousness is accessory to life and not essential to it, natural selection is responsible for ingraining tendencies to avoid certain contingencies without any conscious achievement involved. By the 1960s, scientific behaviourism met substantial difficulties and eventually gave way to the cognitive revolution. Participants in that revolution, such as Jerry Fodor, reject epiphenomenalism and insist upon the efficacy of the mind. Fodor even speaks of "epiphobia"—fear that one is becoming an epiphenomenalist.

However, since the cognitive revolution, there have been several who have argued for a version of epiphenomenalism. In 1970, Keith Campbell proposed his "new epiphenomenalism", which states that the body produces a spiritual mind that does not act on the body. How the brain causes a spiritual mind, according to Campbell, is destined to remain beyond our understanding forever (see New Mysterianism). In 2001, David Chalmers and Frank Jackson argued that claims about conscious states should be deduced a priori from claims about physical states alone. They offered that epiphenomenalism bridges, but does not close, the explanatory gap between the physical and the phenomenal realms. These more recent versions maintain that only the subjective, qualitative aspects of mental states are epiphenomenal. Imagine both Pierre and a robot eating a cupcake. Unlike the robot, Pierre is conscious of eating the cupcake while the behavior is under way. This subjective experience is often called a quale (plural qualia), and it describes the private "raw feel" or the subjective "what-it-is-like" that is the inner accompaniment of many mental states. Thus, while Pierre and the robot are both doing the same thing, only Pierre has the inner conscious experience.

Frank Jackson (1982), for example, once espoused the following view:

According to epiphenomenalism, mental states like Pierre's pleasurable experience—or, at any rate, their distinctive qualia—are epiphenomena; they are side-effects or by-products of physical processes in the body. If Pierre takes a second bite, it is not caused by his pleasure from the first; If Pierre says, "That was good, so I will take another bite", his speech act is not caused by the preceding pleasure. The conscious experiences that accompany brain processes are causally impotent. The mind might simply be a byproduct of other properties such as brain size or pathway activation synchronicity, which are adaptive.

Some thinkers draw distinctions between different varieties of epiphenomenalism. In Consciousness Explained, Daniel Dennett distinguishes between a purely metaphysical sense of epiphenomenalism, in which the epiphenomenon has no causal impact at all, and Huxley's "steam whistle" epiphenomenalism, in which effects exist but are not functionally relevant.

Arguments for
A large body of neurophysiological data seems to support epiphenomenalism .  Some of the oldest such data is the Bereitschaftspotential or "readiness potential" in which electrical activity related to voluntary actions can be recorded up to two seconds before the subject is aware of making a decision to perform the action. More recently Benjamin Libet et al. (1979) have shown that it can take 0.5 seconds before a stimulus becomes part of conscious experience even though subjects can respond to the stimulus in reaction time tests within 200 milliseconds. The methods and conclusions of this experiment have received much criticism (e.g., see the many critical commentaries in Libet's (1985) target article), including fairly recently by neuroscientists such as Peter Tse, who claim to show that the readiness potential has nothing to do with consciousness at all. Recent research on the Event Related Potential also shows that conscious experience does not occur until the late phase of the potential (P3 or later) that occurs 300 milliseconds or more after the event. In Bregman's auditory continuity illusion, where a pure tone is followed by broadband noise and the noise is followed by the same pure tone it seems as if the tone occurs throughout the period of noise. This also suggests a delay for processing data before conscious experience occurs. Popular science author Tor Nørretranders has called the delay the "user illusion", implying that we only have the illusion of conscious control, most actions being controlled automatically by non-conscious parts of the brain with the conscious mind relegated to the role of spectator.

The scientific data seem to support the idea that conscious experience is created by non-conscious processes in the brain (i.e., there is subliminal processing that becomes conscious experience). These results have been interpreted to suggest that people are capable of action before conscious experience of the decision to act occurs. Some argue that this supports epiphenomenalism, since it shows that the feeling of making a decision to act is actually an epiphenomenon; the action happens before the decision, so the decision did not cause the action to occur.

Arguments against
The most powerful argument against epiphenomenalism is that it is self-contradictory: if we have knowledge about epiphenomenalism, then our brains know about the existence of the mind, but if epiphenomenalism were correct, then our brains should not have any knowledge about the mind, because the mind does not affect anything physical, but if the mind is physical so there is no contradiction, and if it is not, it has knowledge about itself anyway.

However, some philosophers do not accept this as a rigorous refutation. For example, Victor Argonov states that epiphenomenalism is a questionable, but experimentally falsifiable theory. He argues that the personal mind is not the only source of knowledge about the existence of mind in the world. A creature (even a philosophical zombie) could have knowledge about mind and the mind-body problem by virtue of some innate knowledge. The information about mind (and its problematic properties such as qualia and the hard problem of consciousness) could have been, in principle, implicitly "written" in the material world since its creation. Epiphenomenalists can say that God created an immaterial mind and a detailed "program" of material human behavior that makes it possible to speak about the mind–body problem. That version of epiphenomenalism seems highly exotic, but it cannot be excluded from consideration by pure theory. However, Argonov suggests that experiments could refute epiphenomenalism. In particular, epiphenomenalism could be refuted if neural correlates of consciousness can be found in the human brain, and it is proven that human speech about consciousness is caused by them.

Some philosophers, such as Dennett, reject both epiphenomenalism and the existence of qualia with the same charge that Gilbert Ryle leveled against a Cartesian "ghost in the machine", that they too are category mistakes. A quale or conscious experience would not belong to the category of objects of reference on this account, but rather to the category of ways of doing things.

Functionalists assert that mental states are well described by their overall role, their activity in relation to the organism as a whole. "This doctrine is rooted in Aristotle's conception of the soul, and has antecedents in Hobbes's conception of the mind as a 'calculating machine', but it has become fully articulated (and popularly endorsed) only in the last third of the 20th century." In so far as it mediates stimulus and response, a mental function is analogous to a program that processes input/output in automata theory. In principle, multiple realisability would guarantee platform dependencies can be avoided, whether in terms of hardware and operating system or, ex hypothesi, biology and philosophy. Because a high-level language is a practical requirement for developing the most complex programs, functionalism implies that a non-reductive physicalism would offer a similar advantage over a strictly eliminative materialism.

Eliminative materialists believe "folk psychology" is so unscientific that, ultimately, it will be better to eliminate primitive concepts such as mind, desire and belief, in favor of a future neuro-scientific account. A more moderate position such as J. L. Mackie's error theory suggests that false beliefs should be stripped away from a mental concept without eliminating the concept itself, the legitimate core meaning being left intact.

Benjamin Libet's results are quoted in favor of epiphenomenalism, but he believes subjects still have a "conscious veto", since the readiness potential does not invariably lead to an action. In Freedom Evolves, Daniel Dennett argues that a no-free-will conclusion is based on dubious assumptions about the location of consciousness, as well as questioning the accuracy and interpretation of Libet's results. Similar criticism of Libet-style research has been made by neuroscientist Adina Roskies and cognitive theorists Tim Bayne and Alfred Mele.

Others have argued that data such as the Bereitschaftspotential undermine epiphenomenalism for the same reason, that such experiments rely on a subject reporting the point in time at which a conscious experience and a conscious decision occurs, thus relying on the subject to be able to consciously perform an action. That ability would seem to be at odds with early epiphenomenalism, which according to Huxley is the broad claim that consciousness is "completely without any power… as the steam-whistle which accompanies the work of a locomotive engine is without influence upon its machinery". Mind–body dualists reject epiphenomenalism on the same grounds.

Adrian G. Guggisberg and Annaïs Mottaz have also challenged those findings.

A study by Aaron Schurger and colleagues published in PNAS challenged assumptions about the causal nature of the readiness potential itself (and the "pre-movement buildup" of neural activity in general), thus denying the conclusions drawn from studies such as Libet's and Fried's.

In favor of interactionism, Celia Green (2003) argues that epiphenomenalism does not even provide a satisfactory solution to the problem of interaction posed by substance dualism. Although it does not entail substance dualism, according to Green, epiphenomenalism implies a one-way form of interactionism that is just as hard to conceive of as the two-way form embodied in substance dualism. Green suggests the assumption that it is less of a problem may arise from the unexamined belief that physical events have some sort of primacy over mental ones.

A number of scientists and philosophers, including William James, Karl Popper, John C. Eccles and Donald Symons, dismiss epiphenomenalism from an evolutionary perspective. They point out that the view that mind is an epiphenomenon of brain activity is not consistent with evolutionary theory, because if mind were functionless, it would have disappeared long ago, as it would not have been favoured by evolution.

See also

 Anomalous monism
 Dualism (philosophy of mind)
 Emergentism
 Frank Jackson
 George Santayana
 Nonreductive physicalism
 Philosophy of mind
 Problem of mental causation
 Property dualism
 Specious present
 Supervenience
 Qualia

Notes

Further reading
 Chalmers, David. (1996) The Conscious Mind: In Search of a Fundamental Theory, Oxford: Oxford University Press.
 Green, Celia. (2003) The Lost Cause: Causation and the Mind-Body Problem,  Oxford: Oxford Forum.
 Jackson, Frank. (1982) "Epiphenomenal Qualia", The Philosophical Quarterly, 32, pp. 127–136. Online text
 James, William. (1890) The Principles of Psychology, Henry Holt And Company. Online text
 
 
Robinson, William (2019) Epiphenomenal Mind: An Integrated Outlook on Sensations, Beliefs, and Pleasure, New York and London: Routledge.

External links

Strange Ideas
Epiphenomenalism Explained, an article by Norman Bacrac in Philosophy Now

Dualism (philosophy of mind)
Theory of mind
Free will